The Independent Spirit Award for Best Male Performance in a New Scripted Series was one of the annual Independent Spirit Awards to honor an actor who has delivered an outstanding performance in a new scripted series. It was first presented in 2020 with Amit Rahav being the first recipient of the award for his role as Yakov "Yanky" Shapiro  in miniseries Unorthodox and the last recipient of the award is Lee Jung-jae for his role as Seong Gi-hun in Squid Game. 

In 2022, it was announced that the acting categories would be retired and replaced with two gender neutral categories: Best Lead Performance in a New Scripted Series & Best Supporting Performance in a New Scripted Series.

Winners and nominees

2020s

References

Best New Scripted Film
American television awards
Awards established in 2020